Neil Dudgeon (born 2 January 1961) is an English actor who, since 2010, has played DCI John Barnaby in the ITV drama series Midsomer Murders. He replaced John Nettles in the lead role, in 2011.

Early life and education
Dudgeon is the son of James C Dudgeon and June M Weeks and has an older sister Lynne W Dudgeon. He was born in Doncaster in 1961 and brought up  there, at that time it was a part of the West Riding of Yorkshire but is now in South Yorkshire. He attended Intake Secondary Modern school in Doncaster, among others. He acted in several school plays (including Rosencrantz and Guildernstern are Dead) and went on to study drama at the University of Bristol (1979–82).

Career

Dudgeon made his first screen appearance in 1987. The following year he appeared as a Second World War pilot in Piece of Cake, alongside Tim Woodward, Jeremy Northam and Nathaniel Parker.

As well as occasional appearances in series such as Casualty, London's Burning and Lovejoy, he appeared in 1994 as Detective Constable Costello, a one-episode subordinate to Detective Inspector William Edward "Jack" Frost (played by David Jason), in the TV series A Touch of Frost, in 1998-99 as George the Chauffeur in The Mrs Bradley Mysteries (alongside Dame Diana Rigg), in Inspector Morse (episode "The Way Through The Woods"), Between The Lines, Common As Muck (in 1994 & 1997), Out of the Blue, Sherlock Holmes and the Case of the Silk Stocking, The Street and four series of Messiah with Ken Stott.

He also appeared in the romantic comedy film Bridget Jones: The Edge of Reason, playing the taxi driver who takes the title character to meet Mark Darcy (played by Colin Firth), towards the end of the film.

In 2007 Dudgeon appeared in the eponymous role of self-made millionaire Roman Pretty in the BBC2 sitcom Roman's Empire. In 2009 he played a main character in BBC's Life of Riley, a series recommissioned and aired in April 2011, the same month that Dudgeon played the role of one time Football League secretary Alan Hardaker in the TV drama United, which was centred on the events of the 1958 Munich air disaster involving Manchester United.

In 2010 Dudgeon appeared in an episode of the ITV crime drama Midsomer Murders, called "The Sword of Guillaume". He was introduced in the episode as the cousin of Detective Chief Inspector Tom Barnaby, played by John Nettles, who retired from the role. Dudgeon, also cast as a senior detective, took over as the lead character in Midsomer Murders after the last episodes featuring John Nettles were screened in 2011. Dudgeon's character name is DCI John Barnaby, which has been suggested may be a vehicle for continued sales to territories where the show is known as "Inspector Barnaby".
Dudgeon had first appeared in Midsomer Murders in the opening episode of the fourth series ("Garden of Death"), playing a secondary character.

In 2012 Dudgeon starred as Norman Birkett on BBC Radio 4's Afternoon Play series in four plays written by Caroline and David Stafford based on Birkett's cases.

Personal life
Dudgeon is married to BBC Radio producer Mary Peate. They have two children, Joe and Greta Dudgeon.

Filmography

Film

Television

References

External links

1961 births
Living people
Actors from Doncaster
English male television actors
English male film actors
English male radio actors
Male actors from Yorkshire